Stambaugh Airport,  is a public use airport located  southeast of the central business district of Iron River, a city in Iron County, Michigan, United States.

Although most airports in the United States use the same three-letter location identifier for the FAA and International Air Transport Association (IATA), this airport is assigned Y73 by the FAA but has no designation from the IATA or ICAO. It is not included in the Federal Aviation Administration (FAA) National Plan of Integrated Airport Systems for 2021–2025.

Facilities and aircraft 
Stambaugh Airport covers an area of 80 acres (32 ha) at an elevation of 1,618 feet (493 m) above mean sea level. It has one asphalt runway; 17/35 is 2,000 by 40 feet (610 x 12 m).

For the 12-month period ending December 31, 2019, the airport had 2,500 aircraft operations, an average of 48 per week: all general aviation.
In January 2023, there were 11 aircraft based at this airport: 10 single-engine and 1 ultralight.

See also
List of airports in Michigan

References

External links 
  at the Iron County website
 

Airports in Michigan
Buildings and structures in Iron County, Michigan